The 2012 Myanmar train crash occurred on 9 November 2012 near Kantbalu in central Burma. A train travelling from Mandalay to Myitkyina and which included seven wagons containing petrol and two containing diesel fuel derailed and burnt. At least 27 people were killed and more than 80 were injured; according to the Information Ministry, many had been trying to collect spilt fuel.

See also
List of rail accidents (2010–2019)

References

Railway accidents in 2012
2012 in Myanmar
Shwebo District
Derailments in Myanmar
November 2012 events in Asia
2012 disasters in Myanmar